is a song recorded by Japanese singer-songwriter Gen Hoshino. It was released through Speedstar Records on April 8, 2022, and used as the ending theme song for the first season of the anime Spy × Family. The song also appeared on Fortnite Soundwave Series. It peaked at number four on Japan Hot 100 and number 127 on Billboard Global 200.

Background and release
On March 17, 2022, Spy × Family official website announced that Gen Hoshino will be performing the ending theme for the anime with "Comedy", premiering on April 9, 2022. It was released as a digital single in Japan on April 8, 2022, through Speedstar Records. The song was also featured on Fortnite Soundwave Series for 72 hours, starting from June 9, 2022.

Composition and lyrics
"Comedy" is composed in the key of C-sharp minor on the verses and the first two chorus, C# major on the bridge and in D minor in the final chorus and is set in time signature of common time with a tempo of 88 BPM, runs for three minutes and 51 seconds. It was composed and written by Gen Hoshino for the anime Spy × Family, with idea of family while being conscious of the sense of family that the story has. "I wrote this song while thinking about the "family" of Loid, Yor, and Anya in Spy × Family and the meaning of the word 'family'," Hoshino says of the song. "While listening to the completed song, I feel that the song is very suitable for the coming warm season when trees are lush and flowers are blooming."

Music video
The music video for "Comedy" was released on May 5, 2022, and directed by MESS. It depicts a form of a certain 'family' in which Hoshino and mysterious creatures live together and go about their daily lives.

Personnel
 Gen Hoshino – vocals, lyrics, composer, arranger, piano, synthesizer
 Mabanua – bass, vibraphone, piano, analog synthesizer, co-arranger
 Ryosuke Nagaoka – guitar, backing vocals, background vocals arranger
 Shojiro Watanabe – mixing
 Takahiro Uchida – mastering
 Satoshi Goto – assistant
 Manabe Hiroshi – assistant

Charts

Weekly charts

Year-end charts

Awards and nominations

References

2022 singles
2022 songs
Anime songs
Japanese pop songs
Spy × Family